John Calvin Thomas (born December 2, 1942) is an American syndicated columnist, author and radio commentator.

Early life and education
Thomas was born in 1942 in Washington, D.C. He attended the American University for his undergraduate education.

Career
During the 1960s and early 1970s he worked as a reporter at NBC News. During a hiatus in his undergraduate education, he joined the U.S. Army, and served at the Armed Forces Radio in New York. His program on CNBC was nominated for a CableACE Award in 1995. His column, which began in 1984, is syndicated by Tribune Content Agency. Thomas joined Fox News as a political contributor in 1997. He was a panelist on Fox News Watch, a Fox News Channel program critiquing media coverage, and until September 2005 hosted After Hours with Cal Thomas on the same network. He also gives a daily radio commentary, syndicated by Salem Radio Network.

From 2005 until the end of 2015, Thomas had been a columnist for USA Today, where he wrote articles with friend and political opposite, Bob Beckel, in the style of "point–counterpoint".

Thomas has written extensively about political issues and he supports, among other things, many American positions related to Israel.

He has written 10 books, including Blinded By Might, that discussed, among other things, the role of the Moral Majority in American politics of the 1980s. Thomas was vice president of the Moral Majority from 1980 to 1985. Thomas is an evangelical Christian, and a member of Fourth Presbyterian Church in Bethesda, Maryland, affiliated with the Evangelical Presbyterian Church.

Political views

Iranian nuclear negotiations
In a 2014 Washington Times article, Thomas claims, "Iranian nuclear negotiators joined with Holocaust deniers, 9/11 truthers and anti-Semites from across the globe."

Barack Obama
In 2014, Thomas criticized the U.S. President Barack Obama for "treating Israel as an enemy".

Islam
In his article "Mumbai Explained", published in the Chicago Tribune, Thomas wrote that "no new [mosques] should be built" in Western countries following the Mumbai terrorist attacks. He further claimed that Muslim immigration posed a danger to the UK and United States.

Following the June 2016 massacre at the Pulse gay nightclub by ISIS sympathizer Omar Mateen, Thomas called for a moratorium on construction of mosques in the United States until "radical Islamist ideology" could be "defeated".

LGBT rights
After Bill Clinton became the first sitting United States president to address a gay rights organization, the Human Rights Campaign, Thomas published a column in November 1997 opposing homosexuality, in which he said:

Thomas published a similar column on October 16, 2009, after Barack Obama became the second sitting United States president to address the Human Rights Campaign. Thomas said:

Personal life
Thomas was married to Charlotte Ray Thomas for 51 years until her death in 2017. Thomas married CJ Berwick, a classmate from Walter Johnson High School, in 2018. The couple now reside in Key Largo, Florida.

Bibliography

 2020, America's Expiration Date: The Fall of Empires and Superpowers… and the Future of the United States
 
 2008, "Mumbai Explained" Cal Thomas Chicago Tribune/Daily Yomiuri
 2007, Common Ground: How to Stop the Partisan War That Is Destroying America with Bob Beckel
 2001, The Wit & Wisdom of Cal Thomas
 1999, Blinded by Might with Ed Dobson
 1994, The Things That Matter Most
 1988, The Death of Ethics in America
 1983, Book Burning

See also

 List of newspaper columnists

References

External links
 Cal Thomas Website
 Cal Thomas at Townhall.com
 The Cal Thomas Commentary (radio show)
 Weekly USA Today Column Common Ground
 
 

1942 births
Living people
20th-century American male writers
20th-century American non-fiction writers
20th-century evangelicals
21st-century American male writers
21st-century American non-fiction writers
21st-century evangelicals
American columnists
American critics of Islam
American evangelicals
American male non-fiction writers
American political writers
American Presbyterians
American radio personalities
American University alumni
Evangelical writers
Journalists from Washington, D.C.
Neoconservatism
United States Army soldiers
The Washington Times people